Qinglong Railway Bridge is the world's longest span concrete arch bridge located in Qinglong County, Guizhou. The bridge forms part of the High speed railway line between Guiyang and Kunming. It crosses the Beipan River just downstream of the Guangzhao Dam. The bridge is almost 300 metres above the river making it the highest high speed railway bridge ever built.

See also
List of highest bridges in the world
List of longest arch bridge spans

References

Bridges in Guizhou
Arch bridges in China
Bridges completed in 2016
Bridges over the Beipan River
2016 establishments in China